Adolph August "A.A." Deering (June 1, 1888 – October 23, 1972) was a member of the Wisconsin State Assembly.

Biography
Deering was born in Hartland, Shawano County, Wisconsin on June 1, 1888.  He was an undersheriff and a bus driver. Deering was a member of the City of Green Bay Industrial Development Authority. He died on October 23, 1972 and is buried in Allouez, Wisconsin.

Career
Deering was elected to the Assembly in 1958 from Green Bay, Wisconsin. He was a Republican.

References

Politicians from Green Bay, Wisconsin
People from Shawano County, Wisconsin
Republican Party members of the Wisconsin State Assembly
1888 births
1972 deaths
20th-century American politicians